Yoke lutes, commonly called lyres, are a class of string instruments, subfamily of lutes, indicated with the code 321.2 in the Hornbostel–Sachs classification.

Description 
Yoke lutes are defined as instruments with one or more strings, arranged parallel to the sound board and attached to a yoke lying on the same plane as the sound table, composed of two arms and a crosspiece. Most of the instruments of the lyre family are played by plucking the strings, but some involve the use of a bow instead.

The sound box can be either bowl-shaped (321.21) or box-shaped (321.22). In the first case, the resonator is often a turtle shell, while the sound board is made of leather. In the second case, usually both the body and the sound board are made of wood.

Examples 
Examples of yoke lutes are the lyre, the cithara and the phorminx from Ancient Greece, the biblical kinnor and the African nyatiti.

However, there are other instruments called "lyra" or "lira" that do not belong, from an organological point of view, to this family, but rather to the handle lutes, such as: the Byzantine lyra, the Calabrian lira, the Cretan lyra, the lira da braccio, the lyra viol.

References